Soft cup may refer to:  

 a disposable menstrual cup
 A type of brassiere, see: List of brassiere designs